Nahāvand Castle was an ancient castle from Sasanian Persia that was located in what is now the city of Nahavand in Hamedan province, Iran. The fall of this castle in the Battle of Nahavand was a major turning point in the Islamic conquest of Persia. Nonetheless, the castle survived up until the time of Naser al-Din Shah Qajar. It was said that when digging a qanat, Naser al-Din Shah found a treasure. He then ordered the castle to be destroyed in order to find more treasures; however, no more were found.

References 

Sasanian castles
Castles in Iran
Military history of Iran
Buildings and structures in Hamadan Province
Ruined castles in Iran
Demolished buildings and structures in Iran

National works of Iran